The  is a training unit belonging to Air Training Command of the Japan Air Self-Defense Force based at Hamamatsu Air Base in Shizuoka Prefecture, Japan.

Aircraft operated

Fighter
 F-4EJ Kai Phantom II
 Mitsubishi F-15J/DJ 
 Mitsubishi F-2A

Trainer
 Kawasaki T-4
 Fuji T-7

References

Units of the Japan Air Self-Defense Force